B. H. Bandara was a Ceylonese politician. He was the member of Parliament of Sri Lanka from Badulla representing the Sri Lanka Freedom Party. He was defeated in the 1977 general election.

References

Members of the 4th Parliament of Ceylon
Members of the 5th Parliament of Ceylon
Members of the 6th Parliament of Ceylon
Members of the 7th Parliament of Ceylon
Sri Lanka Freedom Party politicians
Date of death missing
Year of death missing